The Midwest-China Hub Commission (MCHC) (Chinese: 美国中西部与中国战略经济发展委员会) is a public-private trade collaboration among St. Louis and Missouri governmental officials, business associates and China.

History
In March 2008, the Commission signed two Memorandums of Understanding (MoU) with the Civil Aviation Administration of China (CAAC) (Chinese: 中国民用航空局) and Chinese Ministry of Commerce (MOFCOM) (Chinese: 中华人民共和国商务部) to study a freight initiative.
The primary focus was to open a dialogue to create an economic hub to increase business and cultural exchanges between the two countries. The Commission has completed two studies related to current trade with China and China freight forwarding opportunities.

The Midwest-China Hub Commission was officially formed on January 21, 2009.

The Commission is formed by the voluntary involvement of State and local government and private entities, including:
 City of St. Louis and Lambert-St. Louis International Airport
 Civic Progress
 Missouri Chamber of Commerce and Industry
 Missouri Department of Economic Development (MODED)
 Missouri Department of Transportation (MoDOT)
 Missouri Partnership
 Organization of Chinese Americans St. Louis Chapter
 St. Charles County and Partners for Progress
 St. Louis County
 St. Louis County Economic Council (SLCEC)
 St. Louis Regional Chamber and Growth Association (RCGA)
 World Trade Center - Saint Louis

In 1979, the first sister-city relationship between the U.S. and the People's Republic of China was established between St. Louis and Nanjing.

Industry Business Councils
In December 2009, the Midwest-China Hub Commission and RCGA convened eight industry-specific China Business Councils to gain feedback from local businesses and leaders, help broaden the base of regional knowledge, and catalogue the breadth of business already occurring between the Saint Louis region and China.  The Councils help to identify new opportunities for regional trade and backhaul.

EB-5 Visas
As part of a strategy to encourage foreign investment in the St. Louis region and support international operations, the Midwest-China Hub Commission plans to establish an EB-5 regional center in the greater St. Louis area.  The U.S. Citizen and Immigration Services EB-5 visa program requires potential investors to make qualifying investments ($500,000 or $1,000,000 minimums) and directly or indirectly create or save ten jobs.

The Gateway to the Midwest Investment Center (GMIC) became a non-profit EB-5 Regional Center as of September 27, 2010.  Currently, the GMIC is not approved by US Citizenship and Immigration Services (USCIS), but will gain designation in 2011.

Timeline of events
 February 2008: Ambassador Zhou Wenzhong meets with St. Louis business and political leaders
 March 2008: Missouri Congressional and Trade Delegation visits China to sign MOUs
 April 2008: China's Minister of Foreign Affairs Li Zhaoxing, (Chinese: 李肇星), visits the St. Louis region
 June 2008: China's Vice Premier Wang Qishan, (Chinese: 王岐山), visits the Midwest to expand agricultural trade and investment
 January 2009: Ambassador Zhou Wenzhong and Missouri leaders establish the Midwest-China Hub Commission. The Commission receives an Economic Development Administration (EDA) grant from the U.S. Department of Commerce
 February 2009: St. Louis County Port Authority receives approval to expand the Foreign Trade Zone at Lambert-St. Louis International Airport
 March 2009: The Commission travels to and establishes offices in Beijing
 May 2009: The Commission hosts the China Investment Promotion Agency (CIPA), (Chinese: 商务部投资促进事务局), to discuss investment and trade opportunities
 November 2009: The MCHC is awarded a $1.1 million grant from the State of Missouri to develop air freight for the initiative
 December 2009: Ambassador Zhou Wenzhong hosts the Commission at the Chinese Embassy in Washington, D.C.
 January 2010: The Commission hosts a freight forwarding event at Lambert-St. Louis International Airport to discuss backhaul
 February 2010: Ambassador Zhou Wenzhong visits St. Louis and Jefferson City to demonstrate continued commitment to the MCHC
 March 2010: The Midwest-China Hub Commission travels to China to begin preliminary airfreight negotiations
 May 2010: The RCGA hosted the China Investment Promotion Agency (CIPA) delegation of some 25 biotech companies and investors from throughout China for meetings with bi-state St. Louis plant and life sciences and other business and governmental leaders
 June 2010: Midwest China Hub Commission travels to Shanghai to meet with the Chinese shippers community
 August/September 2010: Republican Senator Kit Bond and Democratic Senator Claire McCaskill, joined by the members of the Midwest China Hub Commission, led a week-long mission of business, labor, civic, and governmental leaders to Beijing and Shanghai.  The delegation met with Civil Aviation Administration of China, China Air Transport Association, Chinese airlines, Ministry of Commerce, Ministry of Foreign Affairs, National Development & Reform Commission, Shanghai Municipal Government, and Shanghai Municipal Commission of Agriculture.  Chinese aviation officials signed an agreement that frames the final issues to be negotiated to establish the Cargo Hub at Lambert International Airport.
 Chinese aviation officials with the Civil Aviation Administration of China (CAAC) (Chinese: 中国民用航空局) and the China Air Transport Association (CATA) (Chinese: 中国航空运输协会) made a commitment to review and assess St. Louis as a potential cargo hub destination with a visit to St. Louis from Oct. 31 to Nov. 5th, 2010.

References

External links
 Missouri Department of Economic Development, http://www.ded.mo.gov
 St. Louis County, https://web.archive.org/web/20100305184535/http://www.co.st-louis.mo.us/
 City of St. Louis, http://stlouis.missouri.org
 Lambert-St. Louis International Airport, http://www.flystl.com
 Missouri Chamber of Commerce and Industry, http://www.mochamber.com
 St. Louis County Economic Council, http://www.slcec.com
 St. Louis Regional Chamber and Growth Association (RCGA), http://www.stlrcga.org
 St. Charles County, http://www.sccmo.org
 Partners for Progress, http://www.partnersforprogress.com
 Missouri Department of Transportation (MoDOT), http://www.modot.mo.gov
 Civic Progress, http://civicprogressstl.org
 Missouri Partnership, http://www.missouripartnership.com
 World Trade Center - Saint Louis, http://www.worldtradecenter-stl.com
 Spectrum Consulting Group, LLC, http://www.spectrumcgllc.com
 The 48 Group Club, http://www.48groupclub.org
 London Export Corporation (LEC), http://www.londonexportcorporation.com
 AeroStrata, https://web.archive.org/web/20110623003045/http://www.aerostrata.org/

Economy of St. Louis County, Missouri
Transportation in St. Louis County, Missouri